The following teams took part in the Division IV tournament which was held in Reykjavík, Iceland, from March 29 to April 4. The winner of the group, New Zealand, was promoted to Division III for the 2012 championships (renamed Division IIA). Initially the tournament was to include Estonia, however the IIHF provide no reason for their absence and did not replace them.  Despite having only five teams the last-placed team in the group, South Africa was temporarily relegated to Division V (renamed Division IIB Qualification).  The number of entrants shrank so South Africa was able to remain at this level.

Results

All times local (GMT/UTC+0)

Statistics

Scoring leaders 
GP = Games played; G = Goals; A = Assists; Pts = Points; +/− = Plus-minus; PIM = Penalties In MinutesSource: IIHF.com

Goaltending leaders 
(minimum 40% team's total ice time)

TOI = Time On Ice (minutes:seconds); GA = Goals against; GAA = Goals against average; Sv% = Save percentage; SO = ShutoutsSource: IIHF.com

Directorate Awards
Goaltender: Shin So-jung, 
Defenseman: Anna Agustsdottir, 
Forward: Emma Gray, 
Source: IIHF.com

References

External links 
 IIHF.com
 Complete results

IV
2011
2010–11 in Icelandic ice hockey
March 2011 sports events in Europe
2010s in Reykjavík
Sports competitions in Reykjavík